Sayed Zayan (17 August 1943 – 13 April 2016) was an Egyptian actor.

Filmography 
 1974: Dunya
 1974: Sons of Silence
 1975: I Want a Solution
 1983: The Beggar
 1986: Easabat Al'nisa
 1987: Mr. Janitor

Plays
Taxi Driver

Death 
Zayan died on the morning of Wednesday, 13 April 2016 in Cairo, at the age of 73, after struggling with disease.

See also 
 List of Egyptians

References

External links 
 
 Sayed Zayan at ElCinema.com (Arabic)

1943 births
2016 deaths
Egyptian male film actors
Egyptian comedians